Gita Jayanti Express is an express train of the Indian Railways connecting  in Madhya Pradesh and  of Haryana. It is currently being operated with 11841/11842 train numbers on a daily basis.

Service

The 11841/Gita Jayanti Express has an average speed of 46 km/hr and covers 824 km in 18 hrs 5 mins. 11842/Gita Jayanti Express has an average speed of 48 km/hr and 824 km in 17 hrs 5 mins.

Route and halts 

The important halts of the train are:

Coach composition

The train has standard ICF rakes with max speed of 110 kmph. The train consists of 23 coaches:
 1 1st AC cum AC 2-tier 
 1 2-tier AC
 2 3-tier AC 
 7 Sleeper class
 10 General
 2 Second-class Luggage/parcel van

Traction

Both trains are hauled by a Ghaziabad Loco Shed-based WAP-7 electric locomotive.

Notes

External links 

 06549/KSR Bengaluru - Belagavi Covid - 19 SF Special - Bangalore to Belgaum SWR/South Western Zone - Railway Enquiry
 06550/Belagavi - KSR Bengaluru Covid - 19 SF Special - Belgaum to Bangalore SWR/South Western Zone - Railway Enquiry

References 

Named passenger trains of India
Rail transport in Uttar Pradesh
Rail transport in Delhi
Rail transport in Haryana
Transport in Mathura
Railway services introduced in 2016
Express trains in India